The Rose of Stamboul is a 1953 West German musical film directed by Karl Anton and starring Inge Egger, Albert Lieven and Grethe Weiser. It was shot at the Tempelhof Studios in West Berlin and on location in Istanbul. The film's sets were designed by the art director Erich Kettelhut. It is based on Leo Fall's 1916 operetta of the same name.

Synopsis
A senior Ottoman official wishes his niece Kondja to return from Vienna to Constantinople and marry a promising young diplomat. She is very reluctant as she has fallen in love with a composer, who is in fact the same man.

Cast

Inge Egger as Kondja Gül
Albert Lieven as Achmed Bey
Grethe Weiser as Madame Desirée
Hans Richter as Fridolin Müller
Oskar Sima as Eduard Effendi
Ingeborg Körner as Midilli Hanum
Gunther Philipp as Marcel Lery
Ethel Reschke as Madame Lery
Otto Matthies as Fridolin Müller
Kurt Vespermann as civil registrant
Franz-Otto Krüger as head waiter
Paul Hörbiger as Mehemed Pascha
Laya Raki as dancer
Ursula Ackermann as female singer
Rasma Ducat as female singer
Herbert Ernst Groh as male singer
Kurt Reimann as male singer
Gisela Deege as dancer
Gert Reinholm as dancer
Werner Stock
Victor Janson

See also
The Rose of Stamboul (1919)

References

External links

West German films
German musical comedy films
1953 musical comedy films
Operetta films
Films based on operettas
Films set in Turkey
Films directed by Karl Anton
Remakes of German films
Sound film remakes of silent films
Films scored by Leo Fall
German black-and-white films
1950s German films
Films shot in Istanbul
Films set in Vienna
Films shot at Tempelhof Studios